Ken Light (born 1945) is a former Archdeacon of Southland.

Light was educated at the University of Otago and ordained deacon in 1970 and priest in 1971. After  Curacies in  Anderson's Bay and Invercargill he held incumbencies at Wyndham and Waimea until his appointment as Archdeacon.

References

Archdeacons of Southland
University of Otago alumni
1945 births
Living people